Bodomzor (formerly Tapkok) is a village in Sughd Region, northern Tajikistan. It is part of the jamoat Guli Surkh in the city of Istaravshan.

References

Populated places in Sughd Region